Korabl-Sputnik 4 ( meaning Ship-Satellite 4) or Vostok-3KA No.1, also known as Sputnik 9 in the West, was a Soviet spacecraft which was launched on 9 March 1961. Carrying the mannequin Ivan Ivanovich, a dog named Chernushka, some mice and the first guinea pig in space, it was a test flight of the Vostok spacecraft.

Korabl-Sputnik 4 was launched at 06:29:00 UTC on 9 March 1961, atop a Vostok-K carrier rocket flying from Site 1/5 at the Baikonur Cosmodrome. It was successfully placed into low Earth orbit. The spacecraft was only intended to complete a single orbit, so it was deorbited shortly after launch, and reentered on its first pass over the Soviet Union. It landed at 08:09:54 UTC, and was successfully recovered. During the descent, the mannequin was ejected from the spacecraft in a test of its ejection seat, and descended separately under its own parachute.

References

Vostok program
Spacecraft launched in 1961
1961 in the Soviet Union
Spacecraft which reentered in 1961
March 1961 events